Haplocochlias williami is a species of sea snail, a marine gastropod mollusk in the family Skeneidae.

Description
The height of the shell attains 2.1 mm.

Distribution
This species occurs in the Atlantic Ocean off Brazil at depths between 15 m and 54 m.

References

External links

williami
Gastropods described in 2002